In enzymology, a trimethylamine-N-oxide reductase (cytochrome c) is an enzyme that catalyzes the chemical reaction

trimethylamine + 2 (ferricytochrome c)-subunit + H2O  trimethylamine N-oxide + 2 (ferrocytochrome c)-subunit + 2 H+

The 3 substrates of this enzyme are trimethylamine, (ferricytochrome c)-subunit, and H2O, whereas its 3 products are trimethylamine N-oxide, (ferrocytochrome c)-subunit, and H+.

This enzyme belongs to the family of oxidoreductases, specifically those acting on other nitrogenous compounds as donors with a cytochrome as acceptor.  The systematic name of this enzyme class is trimethylamine:cytochrome c oxidoreductase. Other names in common use include TMAO reductase, and TOR.  This enzyme participates in two-component system - general.

References

 
 
 
 

EC 1.7.2
Enzymes of unknown structure